Park City Mountain Resort (PCMR) is a ski resort in the western United States in Park City, Utah, located  east of Salt Lake City. Park City, as the ski resort and area is known, contains several training courses for the U.S. Ski Team, including slalom and giant slalom runs. During the 2002 Winter Olympics, it hosted the snowboarding events and the men's and women's alpine giant slalom events.

Opened  in 1963, the resort has been a major tourist attraction for skiers from all over the United States, as well as a main employer for many of Park City's citizens. The resort was purchased by Vail Resorts in 2014 and combined the resort with neighboring Canyons Resort via an interconnect gondola to create the largest lift-served ski resort in the United States.

During the ski season, most slopes and lifts are open from 9:00 a.m. to 4:00 p.m.

History
The resort was opened on December 21, 1963, as Treasure Mountain by United Park City Mines, the last surviving mining corporation in Park City, and the resort was opened with funds from a federal government program to revive the economically depressed town. When it originally opened, it boasted the longest gondola in the United States, as well as, a double chairlift, a J-bar lift, base and summit lodges, and a nine-hole golf course. The gondola was a four-passenger Polig-Heckel-Bleichert (PHB, a German aerial ropeway company). Its sister lift was built at Sugarloaf in Carrabassett Valley, Maine, after top members of Sugarloaf's management visited Park City's lift.

When the slopes first opened to the public, a special Skier's Subway was used to transport skiers nearly  into the mountain through the pitch-black Spiro Tunnel on a mine train, where skiers then boarded a mining elevator ("hoist") that lifted them  to the surface at the foot of the Thaynes Canyon chair, and from there they had access to the entire mountain. Aerial trams once used for hauling ore were converted into chairlifts.

Treasure Mountain's name was changed to the Park City Ski Area for its fourth season of 1966–67; thirty years later, it was renamed Park City Mountain Resort in 1996. The resort has also developed summer activities including an alpine slide, alpine coaster, zip-lines, and several hiking and biking trails.

A sister ski area, originally known as Park City West and later as Canyons Resort, opened in 1968. Deer Valley Resort opened in December 1981, at the site of the former Snow Park (1946–69).

2002 Winter Olympics

During the 2002 games, the resort hosted the men's and women's giant slalom, men's and women's snowboarding parallel giant slalom, and both men's and women's snowboarding halfpipe events. The resort's Eagle Race Arena and Eagle Superpipe were used as the Olympics runs. Temporary stadiums were erected at the end of each run with spectator standing areas on each side, creating a combined capacity of 16,500 persons. Almost all available tickets for events at the resort were sold  99.8 percent   to a total of 95,991 spectators. During the games, 96 percent of the resort was open for normal seasonal operations, making it the only venue to allow spectators to leave and reenter.

2012 litigation
In March 2012, Powdr Corporation (POWDR), owners of Park City Mountain Resort (PCMR), announced that it had filed a lawsuit against Talisker Land Holdings, LLC (Talisker), which owned the adjacent Canyons Resort, as well as United Park City Mines Company, both partial land owners of the resort. The lawsuit filed by POWDR was in response to an eviction notice issued by Talisker, the entity that owns most of the land the PCMR ski runs are on, who had been leasing it to POWDR (a continuation of the existing lease between Park City Mines and POWDR when Talisker bought the land from Park City Mines). POWDR claimed that they had initiated talks with Talisker to extend their lease to 2051, and that Talisker had refused to agree to the terms and threatened to close the resort. In response, Talisker claimed that POWDR had failed to agree to the new terms set down by Talisker, and that they had never threatened to close the resort. POWDR sued Talisker for $7 million (equivalent to $ million in ) for compensatory and punitive damages for the threat of the closure of the resort.

PCMR had leased the land on which its ski runs are located for $155,000 per year, with an option to renew the lease for 20 years. In March 2011, when this option came due, POWDR failed to renew the lease in a timely manner and sent a letter two days after the lease had expired. Eight months later, POWDR received a letter from Talisker that their lease had expired and they were to turn over the leased land and its improvements to Talisker. In 2013, Talisker leased its 4,000 acre Canyons Resort to Vail Resorts (Vail), for $25 million per year plus a percentage of the Canyons Resort revenue, plus a condition that Vail also take over the legal action. Near the end of May 2013, an eviction notice was served on POWDR to vacate the leased land of PCMR, including all infrastructure on said land, which would leave POWDR with just the private land and infrastructure (accommodations, shops, parking, etc.) at the base of the ski runs. 

On September 11, 2014, Vail announced that it had purchased the base of PCMR, including its name and recognition of ski runs improvements, from POWDR for $182.5 million (equivalent to $ million in ) and that it would combine the resort with neighboring Canyons Resort over the summer of 2015 for the 2015–16 season.

Park City Mountain Resort under Vail Resorts
When the purchase was finalized, Vail added Park City Mountain Resort to its EPIC season pass program for the 2014–15 season. In 2015, the merger of PCMR with Canyons was undertaken by Doppelmayr USA as part of a project that built two new lifts and relocated a third. A new gondola called Quicksilver was built between the bottom of  Silverlode at PCMR and a point below the top of Iron Mountain at Canyons. King Con was upgraded to a high speed six pack, while the original King Con high speed quad was relocated to replace the Motherlode triple chairlift. The upgrades on the PCMR side were done to alleviate expected congestion at Silverlode and King Con from the added interconnect gondola. The former Canyons Resort base area was renamed the Canyons Village at Park City and the entire combined resort now operates under the Park City Mountain Resort name.

Park City mountain resort is home to many ski schools run by the mountain, but is also home to privately owned ski schools. In 2017, the various individual clubs came together to form one organization - Park City Ski & Snowboard Club.

For the 2018 season, Doppelmayr constructed a high speed quad to replace the High Meadow lift at Red Pine Lodge.

For the 2019 season, Skytrac built a new fixed grip quad chairlift called "Over and Out" that goes from the bottom of Tombstone to a point just above the top of Sunrise, providing quick egress from the Tombstone and Iron Mountain pods to the Canyons Village base area by alleviating the need to take Tombstone back to Red Pine Lodge. The lift takes about five minutes and thirty seconds to ride.

For the 2022 season, Doppelmayr had been contracted to construct two new detachable chairlifts on the Park City side of the resort. However, after the Park City Planning Commission revoked the permit to replace these lifts in Park City, Vail Resorts announced that these lifts will now be installed at Whistler Blackcomb in 2023 and replace the Jersey Cream and Fitzsimmons lifts there.

Statistics
As of the 2015–16 season, after the merger with Canyons Resort.

Mountain information
 Base elevation: 
 Summit elevation:  
 Vertical rise: 
 Total mountain peaks: 8
 Total skiable area: 
 Average Annual Snowfall:

Trails
 Total Trails: 348
 Beginner: 15%
 Intermediate: 54%
 Expert: 31%
Terrain Parks: 4
Superpipe: 1
Minipipe: 1

Lifts

Slope aspects
 North: 43%
 East: 29%
 West: 24%
 South: 4%

Summer
During the summer, Payday provides lift service to an alpine slide and an alpine coaster. Restaurants are also open during the summer, and will often have live bands and other activities. The resort creates and maintains its own trails and trail connections to the rest of the Park City area trail system. Activities at the resort include miniature golf, a climbing wall, and trampolines with a harness.

The resort offers lift-served access for hiking and mountain biking on Crescent, Payday, and Town lifts from the Park City Mountain Village base. Canyons Village provides hiking and biking access via the Red Pine Gondola and Short Cut. Most trails in the area are family-friendly and not very strenuous. The majority of mountain bike trails are intermediate, with a small percentage designated as expert trails.

In popular culture

Park City is one of the featured mountains in the 2008 video game Shaun White Snowboarding.

References

External links

 Official website
 Ski Utah - Resort Profile

 3dSkiMaps - Park City Mountain Resort 3D map
 ExploreUtah.org - Explore Utah
 Mountain Trails Foundation
  Trailforks Mountain Bike Trail Map

Venues of the 2002 Winter Olympics
Olympic alpine skiing venues
Olympic snowboarding venues
Ski areas and resorts in Utah
Sports venues in Summit County, Utah
Sports venues completed in 1963
1963 establishments in Utah